Cumby High School is a public high school located in Cumby, Texas, USA and classified as a 2A school by the University Interscholastic League. It is part of the Cumby Independent School District located in western Hopkins County.

Athletics

The Cumby Trojans compete in the following sports -

Cross Country, Football, Volleyball, Basketball, Powerlifting, Track, Softball, and Baseball

State Titles
Girl's Powerlifting
2012(1A)

References

External links 
Official site

Public high schools in Texas
Schools in Hopkins County, Texas